Lucienne N'Da (born 6 July 1965) is an Ivorian retired high jumper and four-time African champion. Her personal best jump is 1.95 metres, achieved at the 1992 African Championships in Belle Vue Maurel. This is the current national record. She also competed at two Olympic Games, in Seoul 1988 and Barcelona 1992.

International competitions

References

External links

1965 births
Living people
Ivorian high jumpers
Female high jumpers
Ivorian female athletes
Olympic athletes of Ivory Coast
Athletes (track and field) at the 1988 Summer Olympics
Athletes (track and field) at the 1992 Summer Olympics
World Athletics Championships athletes for Ivory Coast
African Games gold medalists for Ivory Coast
African Games medalists in athletics (track and field)
Athletes (track and field) at the 1991 All-Africa Games